Mónica Pastrana (born September 6, 1989) is a Puerto Rican beauty pageant contestant and  television presenter. She was one of the hosts of the show "Locas de Atar " in Univision Puerto Rico until it was cancelled in 2012. Now she works as a comedian in 
Raymond Y Sus Amigos in Telemundo Puerto Rico.

Beauty pageants

Miss Puerto Rico Universe 2009
On October 22, 2008, Mónica competed at the Miss Puerto Rico Universe 2009 pageant representing the city of Arecibo. Mónica became one of the twenty semi-finalists.

Nuestra Belleza Latina
In the spring of 2009 Mónica competed in the reality show/contest Nuestra Belleza Latina 2009. Mónica became one of the final twelve finalists  in which she then finished in seventh place.

Miss International 2009
On November 28, 2009, Mónica competed at the Miss International 2009 pageant representing her country Puerto Rico, where she unfortunately did not place.

References

1989 births
Living people
People from Manatí, Puerto Rico
Miss Puerto Rico winners
Puerto Rican female models
Miss International 2009 delegates